Giannis Kamitsis (born 20 February 1967) is a retired Greek football midfielder.

Honours
Panionios
 Greek Cup: 1997–98

References

1967 births
Living people
Greek footballers
Irodotos FC players
Ethnikos Piraeus F.C. players
Panionios F.C. players
Thesprotos F.C. players
Doxa Vyronas F.C. players
Marko F.C. players
A.O. Kerkyra players
Agios Dimitrios F.C. players
Super League Greece players
Association football midfielders
Footballers from Chania